Clearwater is an unincorporated community in western Jefferson County, Washington, United States.  Clearwater is located along the Clearwater River and is a primarily timberlands with limited private ownership. The community is just outside the boundaries of the Quinault Indian Reservation.

A post office called Clearwater was established in 1895, and remained in operation until 1966. The community takes its name from the nearby Clearwater River.

Climate
The strong influence of the Pacific give Clearwater heavy year-round precipitation and an Oceanic climate (Cfb), according to the Köppen climate classification system.

References

Unincorporated communities in Washington (state)
Unincorporated communities in Jefferson County, Washington